Joy Davidson (born August 18, 1937, Fort Collins, Colorado; died February 5, 2023, Naples, Florida) was an American operatic mezzo-soprano, actress, and pedagogue. She performed internationally in many of the world's great opera houses.

Life and career
A native of Fort Collins, Colorado, Davidson was a graduate of Fort Collins High School. She earned a Bachelor of Arts degree from Occidental College in 1959.

She worked briefly as an elementary school music teacher before pursuing graduate studies in opera at Florida State University with Elena Nikolaidi. She attended the UCLA Summer Opera Program where she was a student of Jan Popper. She later studied with Irma McDaniels and Daniel Harris in Miami.

Davidson made her professional opera debut in 1965 in the title role of Rossini's La Cenerentola with the Miami Opera. That same year she was engaged by the Metropolitan Opera National Company with whom she toured the United States in performances for the next two years. Among the roles she portrayed with the company was the title role in Benjamin Britten's The Rape of Lucretia.

In 1967 Davidson won first prize in the Sofia International Opera Singers Competition. In 1969 she made her debut at the New York City Opera as Kontschakowna in Borodin's Prince Igor and made her first appearance at the San Francisco Opera as The Secretary in Menotti's The Consul. That same year she portrayed Sister Jeanne in the United States premiere of The Devils of Loudun at the Santa Fe Opera. In 1970 she returned to San Francisco to portray the title heroine in Bizet's Carmen (with Plácido Domingo), and appeared at Philharmonic Hall as the First Angel in Mendelssohn's Elijah with the New York Philharmonic under conductor Lukas Foss.

In 1971 Davidson made her debut at La Scala as Delilah to Pier Miranda Ferraro's Samson in Samson and Delilah. That same year she returned to the NYCO to portray Carmen to Michele Molese's Don José under Julius Rudel in Tito Capobianco's production.

She portrayed The Secretary again for her debuts at the Festival dei Due Mondi and the Spoleto Festival USA in 1972. In 1974 she made her debut at the Vienna State Opera as Carmen and was also seen at that house as  Preziosilla in La forza del destino.

In 1976 Davidson created the role of Hannah Bilby in the world premiere of Carlisle Floyd's Bilby's Doll at the Houston Grand Opera. That same year she made her debut at the Lyric Opera of Chicago as Clarice in The Love for Three Oranges and her debut with the Metropolitan Opera as Adalgisa in Norma (opposite Shirley Verrett). She returned to Chicago in 1978 to create the role of Sin in the world premiere of Penderecki's Paradise Lost, which was subsequently seen at La Scala. In 1979 she created the title role in Garland Anderson's Soyazhe at the Central City Opera.

Engagements in leading roles with opera houses internationally followed, including the Baltimore Opera, the Bavarian State Opera, Dallas Opera, the Dutch National Opera, the Edmonton Opera, the Fort Worth Opera, Opera Guild of Greater Miami (Carmen, opposite Franco Corelli and Norman Treigle in his last Escamillo, 1973), the Liceu, the Maggio Musicale Fiorentino (Agnese di Hohenstaufen, with Leyla Gencer, conducted by Riccardo Muti, 1974), the New Orleans Opera (Carmen), the Sofia National Opera, the Opéra National de Lyon, the Seattle Opera, the Teatro di San Carlo, the Teatro Regio Turino, the Teatro Nacional de São Carlos, Tulsa Opera, and the Welsh National Opera among others.

Miss Davidson's operatic farewell occurred in 1995, at the Florida Grand Opera, as Gertrude in Roméo et Juliette.  Since then, she appeared in the plays MARIA, the life and loves of Maria Callas (by Alma H. Bond) and as the Nurse in the Euripides/Jeffers version of Medea.

References

1937 births
American operatic mezzo-sopranos
Florida State University alumni
Occidental College alumni
Actors from Fort Collins, Colorado
20th-century American women opera singers
Classical musicians from Colorado
21st-century American women